Demetre Roberts is an American college basketball player for the Fairleigh Dickinson Knights of the Northeast Conference (NEC). He previously played for the St. Thomas Aquinas Spartans.

Early life and high school career
Roberts grew up in The Bronx and moved to Mount Vernon, New York at age 11. His mother was a detective in New York City, and he mostly spent time with his grandmother during his childhood. Roberts played basketball for Mount Vernon High School, where he became the starting point guard as a junior. He helped his team win the Class AA state title in his senior season, earning tournament most valuable player honors. He was lightly recruited by NCAA Division I programs and received his only scholarship offer from NCAA Division II program St. Thomas Aquinas.

College career
Roberts played for St. Thomas Aquinas under head coach Tobin Anderson. As a freshman, he was named East Coast Conference (ECC) Rookie of the Year and second-team All-ECC. Roberts earned first-team All-ECC honors in his next three years and won three ECC tournament titles, being named tournament most outstanding player in his senior season. He transferred to Fairleigh Dickinson in the NCAA Division I, following coach Anderson, for his fifth season. Roberts was named first-team All-Northeast Conference. In the first round of the 2023 NCAA tournament, he recorded 12 points, four rebounds and four assists, helping 16-seed Fairleigh Dickinson upset first-seed Purdue, 63–58.

References

External links
Fairleigh Dickinson Knights bio
St. Thomas Aquinas Spartans bio

Living people
American men's basketball players
Sportspeople from Mount Vernon, New York
Sportspeople from the Bronx
Point guards
Fairleigh Dickinson Knights men's basketball players
St. Thomas Aquinas Spartans men's basketball players